The 2nd Silvester Tournament was the second edition of the Silvester Tournament, a women's ski jumping competition held between 27 December 2022 and 1 January 2023.

The competition was based on a knockout system with 50 contestants divided into 25 pairs. The top 30 advanced to the final round, which consisted of 25 winners and the top 5 lucky losers.

It was part of the 2022–23 World Cup season and took place in Villach, Austria and Ljubno ob Savinji, Slovenia with a total of four events (two at each venue).

Tournament

Map of hosts

Schedule

Prize money
The overall winner, Eva Pinkelnig, received €20,000 in prize money and the Golden Owl trophy.

Results

Competition 1: Villach 
 Villacher Alpenarena HS98
(28 December 2022)

Competition 2: Villach 
 Villacher Alpenarena HS98
(29 December 2022)

Competition 3: Ljubno 
 Savina Ski Jumping Center HS94
(31 December 2022)

Competition 4: Ljubno 
 Savina Ski Jumping Center HS94
(1 January 2023)

Overall standings
The final standings after all four events:

References

External links 
 

2022 in ski jumping
2023 in ski jumping
2022 in Slovenian sport
2023 in Slovenian sport
December 2022 sports events in Europe
January 2023 sports events in Europe